David Sojka (born 20 March 1994) is a Czech professional racing cyclist. He rode in the men's 1 km time trial event at the 2017 UCI Track Cycling World Championships.

References

External links
 

1994 births
Living people
Czech male cyclists
Place of birth missing (living people)